The New Zealand Division of the Royal Navy also known as the New Zealand Station  was formed in 1921 and remained in existence until 1941. It was the precursor to the Royal New Zealand Navy. Originally, the Royal Navy was solely responsible for the naval security of New Zealand. The passing of the Naval Defence Act 1913 created the New Zealand Naval Forces as a separate division within the Royal Navy.


History

At its establishment in 1848, the Australia Station encompassed Australia and New Zealand. Under the Australasian Naval Agreement 1887 the colonial governments of Australia and New Zealand secured a greater naval presence in their waters, agreed that two ships would always be based in New Zealand waters and agreed contributions to funding that presence.

In 1901 the Commonwealth of Australia became independent of the United Kingdom.  The Australian Squadron was disbanded in 1911 and the Australia Station passed to the Commonwealth Naval Forces. The Australia Station was reduced to cover Australia and its island dependencies to the north and east, excluding New Zealand and its surrounds, which was transferred under the command of the Commander-in-Chief, China and called the New Zealand Naval Forces.

On 1 January 1921, the New Zealand Naval Forces, which had formerly been under the command of the China Station, were renamed the New Zealand Division of the Royal Navy. Funded by Wellington and increasingly manned by New Zealanders, it operated 14 ships over a period of 21 years, including the cruisers HMS Achilles and HMS Leander, the training minesweeper HMS Wakakura, and the cruiser  which was recommissioned as a base training establishment.

The Commodore's appointment was abolished and forces brought directly under the New Zealand Chief of the Naval Staff from October 1940. The New Zealand Division of the Royal Navy became the Royal New Zealand Navy (RNZN) from 1 October 1941, in recognition of the fact that the naval force was now largely self-sufficient and independent of the Royal Navy.

Ships of the New Zealand Division

Sortable list covering the period from the inception of the New Zealand Division of the Royal Navy in 1921 to the formation of the Royal New Zealand Navy on 1 October 1941.

Commanders

Officers who commanded the New Zealand Division/Station include:

Transition to the Royal New Zealand Navy
When Britain went to war against Germany in 1939, New Zealand promptly declared war and expanded its naval forces. In recognition that the naval force was now largely self-sufficient and independent of the Royal Navy, the New Zealand Division of the Royal Navy became the Royal New Zealand Navy (RNZN) in 1941.

In 1941 there were:
 2 Cruisers
 2 Escort Vessels
 1 Survey Vessel
 1 Minesweeping Vessel

The prefix "royal" was granted by King George VI on 1 October 1941, and ships thereafter were prefixed with HMNZS (His/Her Majesty's New Zealand Ship).

Notes

References
 
 Hocken Collections, 75 Years of the New Zealand Navy bulletin 17, August 1996
 McDougall, R J  (1989) New Zealand Naval Vessels. Page 9-21. Government Printing Office. 
 
 Walters, Sydney David (1956) The Royal New Zealand Navy: Official History of World War II, Department of Internal Affairs, Wellington. Chapter 1b: Genesis of Royal New Zealand Navy

External links
 New Zealand Navy Museum 1921 The New Zealand Division of the Royal Navy
 The Jellicoe Report
 Royal Navy History The Royal New Zealand Navy
 HMS Chatham New Zealand's first cruiser

Royal Navy divisions
Military units and formations of the Royal Navy in World War II
Royal New Zealand Navy

fr:Royal New Zealand Navy
ja:ニュージーランド海軍
no:Royal New Zealand Navy